Lada Dance, born Lada Evgenyevna Volkova in Kaliningrad on September 11, 1966, is a popular Russian jazz and dance music singer.

Her popularity peaked between 1992 and 1996, after which she abandoned her career and switched to building a family. In late 1990s, she also worked as an erotic model for some time.

In 2002, she reappeared, playing one of the lead characters in a Russian TV sitcom Balzac Age, which has been dubbed 'Russian "Sex and the City"'.

Discography
 Night album (1993)
 Dances by the sea (1994)
 Taste of love (1996)
 Fantasies (1997)
 On island of love (1997)
 When the gardens are in blossom (2001)

References

External links
 Official web site

1966 births
Living people
People from Kaliningrad
Russian dance musicians
Russian women singers
Russian pop singers